Machadocara is a genus of African dwarf spiders that was first described by F. Miller in 1970.  it contains only two species, both found in Middle Africa and Zambia: M. dubia and M. gongylioides.

See also
 List of Linyphiidae species (I–P)

References

Araneomorphae genera
Linyphiidae
Spiders of Africa